Erik Husted (3 January 1900 – 10 July 1988) was a Danish field hockey player who competed in the 1920 Summer Olympics and in the 1928 Summer Olympics. He was born in Helsingør and died in Copenhagen. He was the older brother of Otto Husted.

In 1920 he was a member of the Danish field hockey team, which won the silver medal. Eight years later he also participated with the Danish team in the 1928 Olympic tournament. He played all four matches as forward and scored one goal.

References

External links
 
Biography and Olympic Results

1900 births
1988 deaths
Danish male field hockey players
Olympic field hockey players of Denmark
Field hockey players at the 1920 Summer Olympics
Field hockey players at the 1928 Summer Olympics
Olympic silver medalists for Denmark
People from Helsingør
Olympic medalists in field hockey
Medalists at the 1920 Summer Olympics
Sportspeople from the Capital Region of Denmark